The Divorcee is a 1919 American society drama starring Ethel Barrymore in her last silent feature film. The film is based on a 1907 play, Lady Frederick by young Somerset Maugham, which had starred Barrymore on Broadway. The play was already quite dated when this film was made, but the actress was always comfortable with this kind of soap-operish melodramatic material. Herbert Blaché directed, and June Mathis wrote the scenario based on Maugham's play. The film was produced and distributed by the Metro Pictures company.

It is believed to be a lost film. The last known surviving copy was destroyed in the 1965 MGM vault fire.

Plot
As described in a film magazine, Betsy O'Hara (Barrymore) marries Lord Frederick Berolles (Ratcliffe) to please her parents but soon falls in love with another man Sir Paradise Fuldes (Herbert) whom she had initially rejected due to his poverty. Her husband discovers this and becomes verbally abusive towards her and when Sir Fuldes soon comes into fortune, she finds herself more in anguish than ever. Her situation is further worsened when her sister Kitty (Childers), while married to a man of position, has foolishly compromised herself with Robert Montgomery (Kilgour), a cad who forces her to visit his rooms on threat of disclosure. While assisting her sister in the recovery of some old love letters, she is surprised in the apartments of Montgomery and takes responsibility to save her sister's reputation. She is then divorced and her social status is destroyed.

Betsy visits Monte Carlo and while gambling, she meets the married Lord Charles Mereston (Entwistle) who falls in love with her. Despite no encouragement from Lady Frederick, he will not take no for an answer and continues to pursue her. He also happens to be the brother in law to Sir Fuldes whose sister, Lady Mereston (Gordon) appeals for his help to intervene in the matter. Initially resentful of the interference, she sends Lord Mereston about his business using an ingenious device and eventually finds her reward in the arms of Paradise.

Cast

See also
 Ethel Barrymore on stage, screen and radio

Reception
Like many American films of the time, The Divorcee was subject to cuts by city and state film censorship boards. The Chicago Board of Censors in reel 3 cut the holdup of a car, in reel 4 cut two holdup scenes except a direction to flash a three-foot length showing the bandit riding away, and in reel 5 cut the bandit riding away.

References

External links

 
 
 
 
 Lantern slide to the film(archived)
 Scene from the film, with Ethel Barrymore and Holmes Herbert
  still photo with Maude Turner Gordon, unidentified player, Ethel Barrymore, Holmes Herbert (archived)

1919 films
American silent feature films
American films based on plays
Films directed by Herbert Blaché
Lost American films
Metro Pictures films
1919 drama films
American black-and-white films
Films about sisters
Adultery in films
Films about divorce
Silent American drama films
1919 lost films
Lost drama films
1910s American films
1910s English-language films